Richard Ryan Williams, known as Ryan Williams (born 1979), is an American theoretical computer scientist working in computational complexity theory and algorithms.

Education

Williams graduated from the Alabama School of Mathematics and Science before receiving his bachelor's degree in math and computer science from Cornell University in 2001 and his Ph.D in computer science in 2007 from Carnegie Mellon University under the supervision of Manuel Blum. From 2010 to 2012, he was a member of the Theory Group of IBM Almaden Research Center. From Fall 2011 to Fall 2016, he was a professor at Stanford University. In January 2017, he joined the faculty at MIT.

Research

Williams has been a member of the program committee for the Symposium on Theory of Computing in 2011 and various other conferences. He won the Ron V. Book best student paper award at the IEEE Conference on Computational Complexity in 2005 and 2007, and at the best student paper award at the International Colloquium on Automata, Languages and Programming in 2004 from the European Association for Theoretical Computer Science.

Williams’s result that the complexity class NEXP is not contained in ACC0 received the best paper award at the Conference on Computational Complexity in 2011. Complexity theorist Scott Aaronson has called the result "one of the most spectacular of the decade".

Williams has also worked on the computational complexity of k-anonymity.

Personal life
Ryan is married to Virginia Vassilevska Williams, also a theoretical computer scientist.

Selected publications

References

External links
 Ryan William’s homepage at MIT
 
 

Theoretical computer scientists
Living people
1979 births
Cornell University alumni
Stanford University faculty
Massachusetts Institute of Technology faculty